Eastwind Glacier is a glacier that drains part of the southern slopes of Mount Terror in southeast Ross Island. It flows southwest and coalesces with the eastern margin of Terror Glacier where the two glaciers enter Fog Bay. In association with the names of expedition ships grouped on this island, it was named after USCGC Eastwind, an icebreaker that made nine Antarctic deployments in support of science activities from U.S. Navy Operation Deepfreeze, 1955–56, through the 1966–67 season.

References 

Glaciers of Ross Island